Parroty Interactive was an American video game developer based in Larkspur, California, which acted as a division of publisher Palladium Interactive, Inc.

Parroty Interactive created a number of notable parody video games for personal computers running Microsoft Windows or Mac OS. The company's name was intended as a play-on-words between "parody" and "parrot". Palladium Interactive was acquired by The Learning Company in April 1999, and Parroty Interactive was discontinued.

Games developed 
 Pyst (1996), a parody of the popular game Myst
 Star Warped (1997), a parody of Star Wars.
 The X-Fools (1997), a parody of The X-Files
 Microshaft Winblows 98 (1998), a parody of Microsoft Windows 98
 Driven (cancelled), a sequel to Pyst and a parody of the Myst sequel Riven

References 

Defunct video game companies of the United States
Video game companies based in California
Video game companies established in 1996
Video game companies disestablished in 1999
Defunct companies based in the San Francisco Bay Area